Governor Pearce may refer to:

Andrew Pearce (diplomat) (fl. 2010s), 15th Governor of Montserrat since 2018
Francis Barrow Pearce (1866–1926), Acting Governor of Nyasaland in 1910 
Howard Pearce (born 1949), Governor of the Falkland Islands from 2002 to 2006

See also
Governor Pierce (disambiguation)